The Winds of Autumn is a 1976 American Western film directed by Charles B. Pierce and starring Jack Elam, Jeanette Nolan and Andrew Prine.

Plot
In 1884, after freeing a convict from a prison work detail, a family of outlaws take refuge with a Quaker family consisting of two parents, an eleven year old  son, Joel, and a slightly older daughter. After killing the parents and daughter, Joel sets out on his own to seek revenge against the outlaws who senselessly murdered his family.

Cast

References

Bibliography
  Carlo Gaberscek & Kenny Stier. In Search of Western Movie Sites. 2014.

External links
 

1976 films
1976 Western (genre) films
American Western (genre) films
Films directed by Charles B. Pierce
Films set in the 19th century
1970s historical films
American historical films
Films about Quakers
1970s English-language films
1970s American films